The Clackamas Country Fair and Rodeo is a week-long event held at the Clackamas County Fairgrounds in the city of Canby in Clackamas County, Oregon, United States, during the third week of August.

History
The fair has been held yearly since 1907. It was first held in Gladstone Park. The Fair celebrated its 100 year occurrence in 2006. The fair was not held in 1917, 1918, 1942, 1943, 1944, 1945, and 2020.

Activities
Activities include amusement rides, livestock exhibits and competitions, live entertainment on three stages, local handcraft work and produce, and a Professional Rodeo Cowboys Association (PRCA) sponsored rodeo.

Rodeo events
Rodeo events include: bareback, tie-down, saddle bronc, steer wrestling, team roping, barrel racing, and bull riding.

References

External links
 Official Website
 Canby Rodeo

Tourist attractions in Clackamas County, Oregon
Canby, Oregon
Fairgrounds in the United States
Recurring events established in 1907
Festivals in Oregon
August events
Annual fairs
Agriculture in Oregon
Rodeos
Fairs in Oregon
Rodeo venues in the United States
1907 establishments in Oregon
Annual events in Oregon
Festivals established in 1907